Federico Ayos (born May 22, 1992, Buenos Aires, Argentina) is an Argentine actor, best known for his role Santiago in Televisa's telenovela Corazón que miente (2016), and Emiliano in La candidata (2016). Subsequently, he got a recurring role in the first season of the telenovela Mi marido tiene familia. Federico is the son of actress Mónica Ayos, and stepson of actor Diego Olivera. He studied acting at the Televisa Arts Education Center, together with Ela Velden, whom he had dated from 2016-2018.

Filmography

References

External links 
 

Living people
Argentine male film actors
Argentine male stage actors
Argentine male telenovela actors
Argentine male television actors
People from Buenos Aires
People educated at Centro de Estudios y Formación Actoral
1992 births